was a city located on Amami Ōshima in Kagoshima Prefecture, Japan. The city was founded on July 1, 1946.

As of 2003, the city had an estimated population of 41,778 and the density of 327.31 persons per km². The total area was 127.64 km².

On March 20, 2006, Naze, along with the town of Kasari, and the village of Sumiyō (both from Ōshima District), was merged to create the city of Amami. Although the town no longer exists as a legal entity, Naze is still referred to locally as the port and main urban district of Amami city.

External links
 Official website of Amami 

Dissolved municipalities of Kagoshima Prefecture